Harold Horace Hopkins FRS (6 December 1918 – 22 October 1994) was a British physicist. His Wave Theory of Aberrations, (published by Oxford University Press 1950), is central to all modern optical design and provides the mathematical analysis which enables the use of computers to create the wealth of high quality lenses available today. In addition to his theoretical work, his many inventions are in daily use throughout the world. These include zoom lenses, coherent fibre-optics and more recently the rod-lens endoscopes which 'opened the door' to modern key-hole surgery. He was the recipient of many of the world's most prestigious awards and was twice nominated for a Nobel Prize. His citation on receiving the Rumford Medal from the Royal Society in 1984 stated: "In recognition of his many contributions to the theory and design of optical instruments, especially of a wide variety of important new medical instruments which have made a major contribution to clinical diagnosis and surgery."

Biography
He was born into a poor family in the slums of Leicester in 1918 and his remarkable mind was recognised early on. Due to his own genius and the good fortune of having the support of both his family and teachers, he obtained one of only two scholarships, in the whole of Leicestershire, enabling him to attend The Gateway Grammar School. There he excelled, especially in the arts, English, History and other languages. However, the Headmaster, recognising his exceptional gift for mathematics, directed him into science.

So he read physics and maths at University College, Leicester, graduated in 1939 with a first and then  began a PhD in Nuclear Physics. However this was cancelled on the outbreak of war, and he went to work instead for Taylor, Taylor & Hobson where he was introduced to optical design.

For some reason he was not given reserved-occupation status, which led to his being called up and being trained briefly in blowing up bridges. (He was obviously a natural, quickly rising to the rank of 'acting unpaid lance corporal' and winning a prize for his speed at dismantling and reassembling his rifle.) The error of this placement soon became apparent and he was set to work on designing optical systems for the rest of the war and was able at the same time to work on a thesis for his PhD, which was obtained in 1945.

He began a research fellowship at Imperial College London in 1947, lecturing in optics. The next twenty years saw him emerge as one of the foremost authorities in the field of optics. In addition to his own work, he attracted a large number of high quality PhD students from all over the world, many of whom became senior academics and researchers themselves. His reputation as a teacher was second to none. When he moved to Reading University in 1967 to take up the newly created chair in optics, many of his former MSc students at Imperial would travel to Reading to attend his lectures. He always believed that his primary responsibility was his teaching and that the research came second. However he was also totally convinced that teaching and scientific research were vitally important to each other. "Only when you try to teach something do you discover whether you truly understand it."

He used mathematics in the subject. The development of the mathematical description of the behaviour of optical systems was at the centre of his life's work in physics – the application of which produced so many world-famous inventions. He chose to remain at Reading in the post of Professor of Applied Physical Optics until his official retirement in 1984, declining the numerous top appointments he was offered. He believed the continuation of his teaching and research work to be more important and far more rewarding personally. However, he took great delight in having conferred on him the Honorary Fellowships of all the medical Royal Colleges in Britain, together with the highest awards of many of the world's premier scientific bodies including (in 1973) the Fellowship of the Royal Society itself. He was awarded the 1990 Lister Medal for his contributions to surgical science. The corresponding Lister Oration, given at the Royal College of Surgeons of England, was delivered on 11 April 1991, and was titled 'The development of the modern endoscopes – present and future prospects'. This award, for his work on endoscopes, was unusual in that normally it is made to someone working in the field of medicine. He was awarded the 1978 Frederic Ives Medal by the OSA.
What is rather less well-known about Harold Hopkins is that he was also a politically committed man of the left, being an early member of the Communist Party of Great Britain. Coming from a poor and under-privileged background, he understood how essential equal opportunities and good education were if ordinary working class youngsters like himself were to prosper in society.

Major inventions and improvements

Zoom lenses
Following an approach in the late 1940s from the BBC, who wanted a single lens to replace the classic "turret' of different focal length lenses, he produced the now familiar zoom lens. Although there had been earlier attempts to produce a lens which could achieve continuously varying magnification without re-focusing, none of them could provide a good quality image throughout their zooming and aperture ranges. The design of a zoom lens is enormously more complicated and difficult than that of a fixed focal length. The performance of the Hopkins designed zoom lens was such that it revolutionised television images especially outside-broadcasts and opened the way to the ubiquitous use of zooming in modern visual media. It was all the more remarkable for being produced pre-computer, the ray-tracing calculations being performed on large desk top electro-mechanical machines such as the Marchant Calculator. Even so, the early zoom lenses still fell short of the fixed lenses. The application of computer design-programs based on his Wave Theory of Aberrations in conjunction with new types of glass, coatings and manufacturing techniques has transformed the performance of all types of lenses. Whilst zoom lenses can never out-perform fixed focal lengths, the differences are no longer significant in most applications.

Coherent fiber optics, fibroscopes and rod-lens endoscopes

Fibre optics
The ancient Romans knew how to heat and draw-out glass into fibres of such small diameter that they became flexible. They also observed that light falling on one end was transmitted to the other. (We now know this is due to multiple reflections at the internal surface of the fibre.) These multiple reflections in a sense mix the light beams together thereby preventing an image being transmitted by a single fibre – (more accurately, the different path-lengths experienced by individual light-rays alter their relative phases so rendering the beam incoherent and thus unable to reconstitute the image.) The end result is that the light emerging from a single fibre will be some kind of average of the intensity and colour of the light falling on the 'front' end.

Coherent fibre optics
If a bundle of fibres could be arranged such that the ends of the fibres were in matching locations at either end, then focusing an image on one end of the bundle would produce a 'pixel-ated' version at the further end which could be viewed via an eyepiece or captured by a camera. A German medical student, Heinrich Lamm produced a crude coherent bundle in the 1930s of perhaps 400 fibres. Many of the fibres were misaligned and it lacked proper imaging optics. It also suffered from leakage where adjacent fibres touched; which degraded the image still further. To produce a useful image, the bundle would need to contain not a few hundred but tens of thousands of fibres all correctly aligned. In the early 1950s, Hopkins devised a way to accomplish this. He proposed winding a single continuous length of fibre in a figure-of-eight around a pair of drums. Then, when sufficient turns had been added, a short section could be sealed in resin, cut through and the whole straightened out to produce the required coherent bundle. Having polished the ends, he was then able to add the optics he had designed to provide an objective and eyepiece. Once enclosed in a protective flexible jacket the 'fibroscope' (now more commonly called a fiberscope) was born. Details of this invention were published in papers by Hopkins in Nature in 1954 and Optica Acta in 1955. However, the bare fibres still suffered from light leakage where they touched. At the same time a Dutchman, Abraham van Heel was also trying to produce coherent bundles and had been researching the idea of cladding each fibre to reduce this 'cross-talk'. In fact he published details of his work in the very same issue of Nature. Eventually a system for cladding fibres with a layer of glass of lower refractive index was developed (see Larry Curtis et al.) which reduced the leakage to such an extent that the full potential of the fiberscope was realised.

Fibroscopes and borescopes
Fibroscopes have proved extremely useful both medically and industrially (where the term borescope is usually employed). Other innovations included the use of additional fibres to channel light to the objective end from a powerful external source (typically a xenon arc lamp) thereby achieving the high level of full spectrum illumination needed for detailed viewing and good quality colour photography. At the same time this allowed the fibroscope to remain cool, which was especially important in medical applications. (The previous use of a small filament lamp on the tip of the endoscope had left the choice of either viewing in a very dim red light or increasing the light output at the risk of burning the inside of the patient.) In the medical application, alongside the improvement to the optics, came the ability to 'steer' the tip via controls in the endoscopist's hands and innovations in remotely operated surgical instruments contained within the body of the endoscope itself. It was the beginning of key-hole surgery as we know it today. These advances were, of course equally useful industrially.

Rod-lens endoscopes
There are, however, physical limits to the image quality of a fibroscope. In modern terminology, a bundle of say 50,000 fibres gives effectively only a 50,000 pixel image – in addition to which, the continued flexing in use, breaks fibres and so progressively loses pixels. Eventually so many are lost that the whole bundle must be replaced (at considerable expense). Hopkins realised that any further optical improvement would require a different approach. Previous rigid endoscopes suffered from very low light transmittance and extremely poor image quality. The surgical requirement of passing surgical tools as well as the illumination system actually within the endoscope's tube – which itself is limited in dimensions by the human body – left very little room for the imaging optics. The tiny lenses of a conventional system required supporting rings that would obscure the bulk of the lens' area. They were also incredibly hard to manufacture and assemble – and optically nearly useless. The elegant solution that Hopkins devised (in the 1960s) was to use glass rods to fill the air-spaces between the 'little lenses', which could then be dispensed with altogether. These rods fitted exactly the endoscope's tube – making them self-aligning and requiring of no other support. They were much easier to handle and utilised the maximum possible diameter available. As with the fibroscopes, a bundle of glass-fibers would relay the illumination from a powerful external source. With the appropriate curvature and coatings to the rod ends and optimal choices of glass-types, all calculated and specified by Hopkins, the image quality was transformed – light levels were increased by as much as eightyfold with no heat; resolution of fine detail was finally achieved; colours were now true; and diameters as small as a few millimetres were possible. With a high quality 'telescope' of such small diameter, the tools and illumination system could be comfortably housed within an outer tube.

Hopkins patented his lens system in 1959. Seeing promise in this system, Karl Storz GmbH bought the patent and in 1967 began to produce endoscopic instruments with a tremendously brilliant image and superb illumination. Thus began a long and productive partnership between Hopkins and Storz. Whilst there are regions of the body that will forever require flexible endoscopes (principally the gastrointestinal tract), the rigid rod-lens endoscopes have such exceptional performance that they are to this day the instrument of choice and in reality have been the enabling factor in modern key-hole surgery.

Modulation transfer function
Previous to his work, the resolution of an optical system was mainly assessed using 3-bar resolution charts, with the limit of resolution being the main criterion. But Harold studied at the University of Besançon with Duffieux, who had already begun to lay the foundations of Fourier optics. The seminal paper, which he presented in 1962 when he delivered the Thomas Young Oration of the Institute of Physics, was one of the first to establish the modulation transfer function (MTF) – sometimes called the contrast transfer function (CTF) – as the leading measure of image quality in image-forming optical systems. Briefly, the contrast of the image of a sinusoidal object is defined as the difference in intensities between the peaks and troughs, divided by the sum. The spatial frequency is the reciprocal of the period of the pattern in this image, normally measured in cycles/mm. The contrast, normalised to make the contrast at zero spatial frequency equal to unity, expressed as a function of spatial frequency, is the definition of the modulation transfer function. MTF is still used by optical designers as the principal criterion of image quality, although its measurement in production is less widespread than it used to be. Today it is calculated from the lens data using software such as OSLO, Zemax
and Code V.

'Laserdisc and CD' optics
Originally an analogue video play-back system, the Philips laserdisc format was adapted to digital in the late 1970s and was the forerunner of the CD and DVD. The digital data is encoded as a series of depressions in a reflective disc. They are arranged along a spiral path such that a laser can read them in sequence (in similar fashion to a stylus following the groove on a vinyl record). The laser must be focused onto and track this path and in addition, the reflected beam must be collected, diverted and measured. The prototype optics to achieve this was an expensive glass-lens arrangement. Hopkins was able to show, through a complete mathematical analysis of the system, that with a carefully calculated geometry, it was possible to use a single piece of transparent moulded-plastic instead. This continues to be a major factor in the low cost of laser disc-readers (such as CD players).

The Hopkins Building, University of Reading
On 12 June 2009 the Hopkins Building was officially opened by his son Kelvin Hopkins, the Labour MP for Luton North. This brought together under one roof, the biomedical and pharmaceutical research interests of the University. Whilst not directly involved in the applications of optics, this new facility, in its pursuance of the highest standards of teaching and research, provided an opportunity to honour one of the University's most illustrious academics.

References

External links
A Fiber-Optic Chronology

1918 births
1994 deaths
Alumni of the University of Leicester
British physicists
English inventors
Academics of the University of Reading
Fellows of the Royal Society
People from Leicester
Optical physicists
Recipients of the St Peter's Medal